Brookhaven is a ghost town in Bell County, in the U.S. state of Texas. It is located within the Killeen-Temple-Fort Hood metropolitan area.

History
Brookhaven's original name was Post Oak Branch and became the site of several revivals and camp meetings sometime before 1882. That year, its name was changed to Brookhaven for Brookhaven, Mississippi, where Charlie and Ed Oswalt lived before relocating to the area. A post office was established at Brookhaven in 1884 and remained in operation until 1913. It had a Masonic hall, a cotton gin, two general stores, two drugstores, and three churches for Baptist, Methodist, and Presbyterian congregations serving 75 residents in 1896. It dropped to 50 in the mid-1940s and had two businesses. It was subsumed into the Fort Hood military base and no longer appeared on the Texas Almanac.

Geography

Education
Brookhaven's local school was built in the summer of 1882 and had 132 students enrolled in 1903. Today, Brookhaven is located within the Belton Independent School District.

References

Ghost towns in Texas